Bill Aman (born October 5, 1946) is an American politician who served in the Connecticut House of Representatives from the 14th district from 2005 to 2017.

References

1946 births
Living people
Republican Party members of the Connecticut House of Representatives
Politicians from Buffalo, New York